Twenty-four business routes of Interstate 15 (I-15) exist. Former routes also exist.

California

Interstate business routes in California are assigned by the California Department of Transportation (Caltrans), but are not maintained by Caltrans unless they overlay other routes of the state highway system. Local authorities may request route assignment from the Caltrans Transportation System Information Program, and all requests require approval of the executive committee of the American Association of State Highway and Transportation Officials (AASHTO).

Escondido business loop

Interstate 15 Business (I-15 Bus.) provides access to downtown Escondido as Centre City Parkway. It follows the former routing of U.S. Route 395 (US 395).

I-15 Bus. begins at I-15 exit 28 near the southern city limits of Escondido. It runs parallel to I-15 north through the city. It intersects both the westbound and eastbound portions of County Route S6, which in this area is split into one-way roads (which are in turn separated by another street). This intersection provides access to the end of the Sprinter commuter train line. Shortly thereafter, I-15 Bus. intersects County Route S14, and then interchanges with California State Route 78 (SR 78). The interchange is the last interchange on SR 78 before its freeway status ends, and there are only ramps for a westbound entrance or eastbound exit. Continuing north, I-15 Bus. intersects with El Norte Parkway, a major arterial road, before reconnecting with I-15 at exit 34 near the northern city limits of Escondido. Though the street itself continues northward well on into Temecula as a frontage road for I-15, its designation as I-15 Bus. ends at this interchange.

Lake Elsinore business loop

Interstate 15 Business in Lake Elsinore, California, provides access to downtown Lake Elsinore as Main Street, Graham Avenue, Lakeshore Drive, and Lake Street. It also follows the former routing of SR 71.

Norco business loop

Interstate 15 Business in Norco, California provides access to downtown Norco as Second Street, Hamner Avenue, and Sixth Street. It also follows the former routing of SR 31.

Victorville business loop

Interstate 15 Business in Victorville, California, provides access to downtown Victorville as Seventh Street and D Street. It also follows the former routing of US 66 and US 91.

Barstow business loop

Interstate 15 Business in Barstow, California, provides access to downtown Barstow as L Street and Main Street. It also follows the former routing of US 66.

Baker business loop

Interstate 15 Business in Baker, California, provides access to downtown Baker as Baker Boulevard. It also follows the former routing of US 91 and US 466.

Utah

St. George business loop

Interstate 15 Business in St. George, Utah, is the first business route along I-15 in the state of Utah. It runs from exit 6 north along Utah State Route 18 (SR-18, Bluff Street) to SR-34 (West St. George Boulevard), where it turns east until reaching exit 8.

Cedar City business loop

Interstate 15 Business in Cedar City, Utah, is the second business route along I-15 in the state of Utah. It runs from exit 57 north along SR-130 (Main Street), where it runs near Southern Utah University and the Paiute Indian Reservation-Cedar City until reaching exit 62.

Parowan business loop

Interstate 15 Business (I-15 Bus.) in Parowan, Utah, is the third business route along I-15 in the state of Utah. It runs from exit 75 along SR-143, at first east on 200th Street, then north on South Main Street (Old US Highway 91) until SR-143 turns east onto East Center Street. I-15 Bus. then continues north along SR-274 (North Main Street) eventually serving as the western terminus of SR-271 near Parowan Airport until finally terminating at exit 78.

Beaver business loop

Interstate 15 Business in Beaver, Utah, is the fourth business route along I-15 in the state of Utah. It runs from exits 109 to 112 along SR-160.

Fillmore business loop

Interstate 15 Business in Fillmore, Utah, is the fifth business route along I-15 in the state of Utah. It runs from exits 163 to 167 along SR-99.

Nephi business loop

Interstate 15 Business in the vicinity of Nephi, Utah, is the sixth business route along I-15 in the state of Utah. It runs from exits 222 to 228 along part of SR-28.

Brigham City business loop

Interstate 15 Business (I-15 Bus.) is a Business loop of I-15 in Bringham City, and is also concurrent with I-84 Bus. It runs from an interchange at exit 362 on I-15/I-84 at first along US 91 to the intersection with US 89 and SR-13. US 91 continues east along US 89, while I-15 Bus. / I-84 Bus. turn left to go north along SR-13 (South Main Street). Further in town, the road serves as the west end of SR-90. At Forest Street, South Main Street becomes North Main Street. North of there, SR-13 / I-15 Bus. / I-84 Bus. curves to the left onto Promontory Road, while North Main Street's designation is replaced by SR-38. From there, the routes run beneath a bridge for North 500th Street West and then another bridge for a Union Pacific Railroad line, eventually ending at a folded-diamond interchange with I-15/I-84 at exit 365, while SR-13 continues to run northwest through Corinne and points further north.

Tremonton business loop

Interstate 15 Business (I-15 Bus.) in the vicinity of Tremonton, Utah, is the last business route along I-15 in the state of Utah. It runs from exit 376 in Elwood at the I-15/I-84 overlap, running north along SR-13 (4700th Street West). It also runs along a concurrency with I-84 Bus. At the intersection with SR-102, I-15 Bus. / I-84 Bus. turn west onto East Main Street, while SR-13 continues north toward Riverside and Plymouth. At North and South Tremonton Street, SR-102 / I-15 Bus. / I-84 Bus. changes from East Man Street to West Main Street, then I-15 Bus. leaves the concurrency with SR 102 / I-84 Bus. at the intersection with Iowa String Road where it turns north. I-15 Bus. runs along the Box Elder County Fairgrounds, then, at the Bear River Hospital, makes one last left turn west onto West 1000th Street North until finally terminating at exit 381 on I-15.

Idaho

McCammon business loop

Interstate 15 Business (I-15 Bus.) has a length of  through McCammon in central Bannock County. I-15 Bus. begins at I-15 exit 44 along Jensen Road, then turns north and follows State Street to the city of McCammon. Just north of the city limits, the business route veers onto Center Street and follows that through the center of town. At the north end of the city, I-15 Bus. turns west and runs concurrently with US 30 to its northern end at I-15 exit 47.

Inkom business loop

Interstate 15 Business (I-15 Bus.) runs for exactly  through Inkom in northern Bannock County. I-15 Bus. mostly follows Old Highway 91 between exits 57 and 58, a pair of partial interchanges.

Pocatello business loop

Interstate 15 Business (I-15 Bus.) spans  through Pocatello in northern Bannock County. I-15 Bus. begins at I-15 exit 67, where US 30 and US 91 also diverge from I-15. The business route and the U.S. Routes follow Fifth Avenue northwest. The routes split onto a one-way pair of Fifth Avenue northbound and Fourth Avenue southbound. The highways pass by Idaho State University and through downtown Pocatello. At the north end of downtown, I-15 Bus. and the U.S. Routes veer north and converge as Pocatello Avenue. US 30 turns west at Oak Street; the business route and US 91 continue north along Yellowstone Avenue. I-15 Bus. leaves US 91 when it turns east onto Alameda Road, which becomes Pocatello Creek Road when it veers northeast to the business route's terminus at I-15 exit 71.

Blackfoot business loop

Interstate 15 Business (I-15 Bus.) has a length of  through Blackfoot in central Bingham County. I-15 Bus. begins at I-15 exit 89 near the northern end of the Fort Hall Indian Reservation and follows US 91 northeast parallel to the Union Pacific Railroad. The highways cross the Blackfoot River into the city of Blackfoot along Broadway Street. In downtown Blackfoot, the routes veer onto Main Street, then I-15 Bus. turns northwest onto a one-way pair, Bridge Street northbound and Judicial Street southbound. The streets converge as Bridge Street, which the business route follows to its end at I-15 exit 93. The roadway continues beyond the interchange as US 26 and immediately crosses the Snake River.

Idaho Falls business loop

Interstate 15 Business (I-15 Bus.) runs for  through Idaho Falls in western Bonneville County. I-15 Bus. begins at I-15 exit 116, which is also where US 26 diverges from the Interstate. The business route and U.S. Route follow Sunnyside Road across the Snake River to Yellowstone Avenue; this intersection forms the northern terminus of US 91. I-15 Bus. and US 26 follow Yellowstone Avenue northeast parallel to the Union Pacific Railroad into downtown Idaho Falls. At the intersection of Yellowstone Avenue and Broadway Street, I-15 Bus. turns northwest onto Broadway Street and runs concurrently with US 20 Bus. across another bridge over the Snake River to their mutual termini at I-15 exit 118. The roadway continues west as US 20.

Montana

Dillon business loop

Interstate 15 Business (I-15 Bus.) is a business loop of I-15 in Dillon. It runs from a diamond interchange at exit 62 along Atlantic Street, Helena Street and Montana Street to a brief overlap with Montana Highway 41 (MT 41) that ends at a trumpet interchange at exit 63.

Route description
The I-15 Business Loop begins at exit 62 across from a road leading to the Kiwanis International-established Cornell Park, then, after crossing a bridge over an Oregon Short Line Railroad line, curves north along Atlantic Street, briefly crossing another bridge overnight Blacktail Deer Creek. Between East Chapman and East Poindexter Streets, the route is joined by the former US 91. At Beaver County High School, I-15 Bus. makes a left turn onto Helena Street and, just before crossing the same OSR tracks it ran over earlier, makes a right turn onto Montana Street. Moving away from Downtown Dillon, Former US 91 branches off to the northwest, then across from the intersection with Ramshorn Street, the road turns west onto a wrong way concurrency with MT 41. I-15 Bus. / MT 41 climbs a bridge over former US 91 as well as the OSR line and Blacktail Deer Creek all at once, then makes a southbound curve before finally ending at a trumpet interchange at exit 63.

Butte business loop

Interstate 15 Business (I-15 Bus.) is a business loop of I-15 in Butte. It runs from a flyover interchange at exit 124 on I-90 at I-115 to a partial cloverleaf interchange with MT 2 at exit 127. Beside I-115, I-15 Bus. is also concurrent with I-90 Bus.

Helena business loop

Interstate 15 Business (I-15 Bus.) is a business loop of I-15 in the capital city of Helena. It runs west from exit 192 along US 12 in Montana at the east end of a one-way pair along Prospect Avenue westbound and 11th Avenue eastbound. At North Montana Avenue, both US 12 and I-15 Bus. turn north, but US 12 curves west onto East Lyndale Avenue between Boulder Avenue and Helena Avenue, and I-15 Bus. follows along this curve, while North Montana Avenue continues north as Lewis and Clark County Road 229. At North Last Chance Gulch, I-15 Bus. turns north-northeast while US 12 continues west along West Lyndale Avenue and I-15 Bus. passes between Centennial Park and Memorial Park, the grounds of the stadium used by the Helena Brewers. After crossing a bridge over a former Northern Pacific Railroad line, I-15 Bus. begins to turn northeast and then, at the intersection of North Montana Avenue, becoming Cedar Street running east, eventually ending at I-15 on exit 193 across from the Helena Regional Airport.

Great Falls business loop

Interstate 15 Business (I-15 Bus.) in Great Falls, Montana, links I-15, which bypasses downtown Great Falls to the west, to the center of Great Falls. As its business loop designation implies, I-15 Bus. terminates at I-15 (concurrent with US 89 and MT 200 through western Great Falls) at each end. The southernmost  of the route, from the interchange with I-15 to Fox Farm Road, is designated, but not signed, as Interstate 315. It is the second shortest Interstate in the country, the shortest being I-878.

Conrad business loop

Interstate 15 Business is a business loop of I-15 in Conrad. It runs along Old Highway 91 from diamond interchanges at exit 335 and exit 339. The north end was originally a half-diamond/trumpet interchange until it was rebuilt in the 2010s, and was given a rest area / truck weigh station east of the interchange.

Shelby business loop

Interstate 15 Business (I-15 Bus.) in Shelby, Montana links I-15, which bypasses downtown Shelby to the west, to the center of Shelby. The southern terminus of I-15 Bus. is at exit 363 on I-15; from there it follows US 2 into the center of Shelby, then follows Montana Highway 67 (Oilfield Road) across the railyard and through the north end of town to its northern terminus at exit 364 on I-15, just south of Shelby Airport.

Former routes

Las Vegas business loop

Mesquite business loop

Interstate 15 Business in Mesquite, Nevada, was also designated as State Route 144. It was removed as of December 31, 2005. It covered Mesquite Boulevard and Sandhill Boulevard in Mesquite. The State Route designation was applied to the portion of Mesquite Boulevard from its southern crossing of I-15 to Sandhill Boulevard, then along Sandhill Boulevard to its northern crossing of I-15.

Route 144, from SR 170 to Hillside Drive, was once US 91, which used to stretch from Sweetgrass, Montana, to Long Beach, California.

Holden business loop

The former Interstate 15 Business in Holden, Utah, served I-15 in the state of Utah. It ran from exit 174 at SR-64 to US 50 where it terminated at exit 178, the southern terminus of the I-15 / US 50 overlap.

Payson business loop

Layton business loop

See also

References

External links
Interstate Business Route 15 (InterstateGuide.com)

15
Interstate 15